Montferrand was a fortress in the County of Tripoli (at the present-day village of Baarin in Syria), built in 1126.

Early history

The construction of Montferrand started when the united crusader troops from Jerusalem, Tripoli and Antioch laid siege to Rafaniya on 13 March 1126. Originally, it was destined to complete the blockade of Rafaniya and to secure the protection of the besiegers. Rafaniya fell to the crusaders on 31 March.

Loss

Count Raymond II of Tripoli granted his claims to Montferrand and Rafaniya to the Knights Hospitallers in 1142 to persuade them to make efforts to recapture it.

References

Sources

 
 

Crusader castles
Castles in Syria
County of Tripoli
1120s in the Crusader states